Sorry: A Love Story is an upcoming Pakistani romantic drama film. The film features Faysal Qureshi, Faryal Mehmood, Zahid Ahmed and Aamina Sheikh in leading roles. Sorry: A Love Story is written and directed by Sohail Javed. Production of the film was interrupted by the COVID-19 pandemic.

Cast 
 Faysal Qureshi
 Faryal Mehmood
 Zahid Ahmed
 Aamina Sheikh

References 

Urdu-language Pakistani films
Pakistani romantic drama films
Lollywood films
Film productions suspended due to the COVID-19 pandemic
Unreleased Pakistani films
Upcoming films